The Mystery of the Hansom Cab is an Australian feature-length film directed by W. J. Lincoln based on the popular novel, which had also been adapted into a play. It was one of several films Lincoln made with the Tait family, who had produced The Story of the Kelly Gang.

It was the first Australian feature film to have a predominantly urban setting. It has been called the world's first suspense mystery film.

Plot
A Melbourne playboy, Oliver White, is murdered as he is driven home one night in a hansom cab. Investigating the crime encompasses all aspects of Melbourne society. The scenes featured in the movie were:
GUNSLER'S CAFE, COLLINS STREET
The meeting of Mark Frettleby and Rosanna Moore. 
Reems Street, East Melbourne. The Courtship. 
Frettleby's Station. Divided Lives. (Rosanna grows bored with station life and eventually leaves with their baby daughter.)
Frettleby's New Love. Frettleby's Rooms. 
The News of Rosanna's Death. (Mark Frettleby receives a letter from England telling him this.)
Room at Myrtle Orange. I love you. 
Twenty years later.
Frettleby's Mansion, St Kilda. (Frettleby is a pillar of society, widowed with a daughter, Madge.)
The Ghost of the East.
Possum Villa. Grey Street. St Kilda.
Two Men at War. (Two men wish to marry Madge, the dissolute Oliver Whyte and the squatter Brian Fitzgerald.) 
The Orient Hotel, Bourke Street.
The Melbourne Club, Collins street. 
Brian receives a Message.
The Cabstand. Scots Church.
DRIVE TO ST. KILDA. 
Austral Hotel, Bourke Street. 
Sal Rawlins shows the way.
Mother Guttersnipe's, Bourke Street.
Death of Rosanna Moore.
The Fatal Drive.
Collins street. Princes, Bridge. 
St. Kilda Road.
THE MURDER IN THE CAB – Opposite Church of England Grammar School. 
Who is the Man? Esplanade, St, Kilda. 
The Discovery of the Crime.
Possum Villa. On the Track.
The Arrest of Brian Fitzgerald. 
Carlton's Office, Chancery Lane.
A Woman to the Rescue. The Melbourne Gaol. 
Brian Refuses to Streak. Calton's Office.
The Reward for Sal. Rawlins. Mother Guttersnipe's, Bourke Street.
No News. The Law Courts,
Law Court. The Cabman's Story.
Menzie's Hotel. Return of Sal. Rawlins. 
Acquittal of Brian Fitzgerald
Mother Guttersnipe's. The Last Call.
Mark Frettleby's Home. The Confession.
On the Lawn. Who is the Man?
Frettleby's Study. Blackmail.
You Killed Oliver Whyte – Death of Mark Frettleby – End of the Astounding Mystery

Production
With the exception of one scene in the countryside, shooting took place in Melbourne, with extensive featuring of local landmarks such as the Melbourne Club, Scot's Church, Collins Street, the Orient Hotel, the Esplanade at St Kilda and Melbourne Gaol. The murder sequence, although set at night time, was shot in the afternoon for better lighting.

A newspaper report on 25 March 1911 said the film was to be "produced" in Sydney but this may be a reference to the release of the film.

In 1924 "Nero" wrote to The Bulletin to say "the interiors... were taken in one day at a   little back-yard studio in St. Kilda, and the exteriors at odd moments during the rest of the week.   About a fortnight later the completed effort was shown at the Glaciarium, where it ran for three weeks."

Reception
The Melbourne Argus wrote that:
Cab is almost as familiar to Australian readers as Robbery Under Arms or The Term of His Natural Life. Its thrilling incidents provide splendid material for a moving picture drama, and in obtaining the desired film the cinematograph experts have secured an excellent presentation of the features of the novel... The audience took over an hour to throw on the screen, but the keen interest of the audience was held throughout.
The film was usually accompanied by a lecturer.

The movie was a popular success at the box office, particularly in Melbourne. In April 1911 The Bulletin reported:
West's, at Sydney Glaciarium, is booming with Fergus Hume's success, The Mystery of a Hansom Cab. Ever since the drama has been running across the screen, money has had to be turned from the doors. In addition to the Mystery there is the usual varied programme; but the items are changed so frequently these nights that it is hardly worth mentioning them.   Anyhow, for the present they are completely eclipsed by the Cab story.
In 1924 "Nero" of The Bulletin looked back on the film writing "The photography was only fair, and the acting might have been improved upon, but the local   "bits", such as the Town Hall clock, the Orient Hotel, the Melbourne Club, the cab going over Prince's Bridge, the murder on St. Kilda-road and the old Esplanade Hotel at St.   Kilda, were considered enthralling.   I had rather a   surfeit of the picture myself, because I   not only played in it, but lectured on it, and it was rather trying to watch oneself doing the wrong thing night after night for three weeks."

USA Release
The film was released in the US in August 1914 by Sawyer Pictures.

Later Versions
According to W. J. Lincoln an overseas film adaptation soon followed. There was also another version in 1925.

References

External links
 
The Mystery of a Hansom Cab at AustLit
 The Mystery of a Hansom Cab (1911) at National Film and Sound Archive

1910s Australian films
1911 films
Australian black-and-white films
Australian silent feature films
Films set in colonial Australia
Films directed by W. J. Lincoln
Silent drama films